Christoph Schmidberger (born 1974 in Eisenerz, Austria) is a painter based in Los Angeles. He studied from 1989 to 1994 at the Higher Technical College of Graphic Art in Graz, Austria, and graduated with an Honours and Master of Art from the Academy of Fine Arts in Vienna in 2002.

His works, drawn or painted in a hyperreal style, typically use traditional compositional forms (woodland scenes, reclining lovers, portraits with pets, etc.) to portray youthful eroticised figures relaxing in modern suburban settings. ("Christoph Schmidberger paints a kitschy dream of pre-Raphaelite surrender, revelling in pornography's influence on today's sexual economy").

Schmidberger's work has been shown internationally at galleries and museums such as the Museum of Contemporary Art San Diego, the Frederick R. Weisman Museum of Art in California, the Landesmuseum Joanneum (Joanneum National Museum) in Graz, Austria, and the Royal Academy in London. His work features in several important collections including the Saatchi Gallery, the Museum of Fine Arts, Boston, the Los Angeles County Museum of Art, the Joslyn Museum of Art, and Österreichische Galerie Belvedere.

He is represented by Patrick Painter Inc. in Santa Monica, California, and Union Gallery in London.

Selected Public Collections
Museum Of Fine Arts, Boston, MA
The Saatchi Collection, London
Los Angeles County Museum Of Art, Los Angeles, CA
Museum Of Contemporary Art, San Diego, CA
Joslyn Museum Of Art, Omaha, NE
Frederic R. Weismann Collection, Los Angeles, CA
Neue Galerie Am Landesmuseum Joanneum, Graz
Korban Art Foundation, New York
Vanhaerents Art Collection, Brüssels
Volpinum Kunstsammlung, Vienna

Bibliography
Christoph Schmidberger, Levander Fields Forever, Mark Moore Gallery, Santa Monica, 2003. 
Christoph Schmidberger, Michele Robecchi, The Beginning of the End, Brand New Gallery, Milan, 2011.

References

External links
Official website
Christoph Schmidberger, Patrick Painter

20th-century Austrian painters
20th-century American male artists
Austrian male painters
Austrian contemporary artists
21st-century Austrian painters
21st-century American male artists
20th-century American painters
American male painters
21st-century American painters
Postmodern artists
1974 births
Living people
Art in Greater Los Angeles
Photorealist artists
20th-century Austrian male artists